The first election to Neath Borough Council was held in April 1973. It was followed by the 1976 election. On the same day there were elections to the other local authorities and community councils in Wales.

Results

Blaengwrach (one seat)

Briton Ferry (four seats)

Bryncoch (three seats)

Cadoxton (one seat)

Cilfrew (one seat)

Coedffranc (four seats)

References

1973
1973 Welsh local elections